Adam Trautman (born February 5, 1997) is an American football tight end for the New Orleans Saints of the National Football League (NFL). He played college football at Dayton and was drafted by the Saints in the third round of the 2020 NFL Draft.

Early life and high school
Trautman grew up in Williamsburg, Michigan and attended Elk Rapids High School, where he played basketball and football and was an All-County selection in both sports. Trautman set every major school passing record and was named the Lake Michigan Conference Player of the Year as a senior.

College career
Trautman redshirted his true freshman season as he changed positions from quarterback to tight end. As a redshirt freshman, he caught 24 passes for 238 yards and three touchdowns. He had 43 receptions for 537 yards and five touchdowns and was named second-team All-Pioneer Football League in his sophomore season. As a junior, Trautman led the team with 41 receptions, 604 yards and nine touchdowns and was again named second-team All-PFL. As a Senior, he was named the PFL Offensive Player of the Year and first-team All-PFL after catching 70 passes for 916 yards and 14 touchdowns. He finished his collegiate career with 171 receptions for 2,295 yards and 31 touchdowns. Trautman played in the 2020 Senior Bowl, catching two passes.

Professional career

Trautman was drafted by the New Orleans Saints in the third round with the 105th overall pick of the 2020 NFL Draft. He was the first Dayton football player to be drafted since Bill Westbeld in 1977. Trautman made his NFL debut on September 13, 2020 in the season opener against the Tampa Bay Buccaneers, becoming the first Dayton player to appear in an NFL game in 45 years. He caught a 17-yard pass from Drew Brees for his first career reception on September 21, 2020 on Monday Night Football in a 34–24 loss to the Las Vegas Raiders. In Week 9, against the Tampa Bay Buccaneers, he had three receptions for 39 yards and his first professional touchdown reception in the 38–3 victory. In a humorous incident, the Buccaneers were unable to find a picture of Trautman to use on their scoring display, and instead used a picture of then-Rams quarterback Jared Goff. He finished his rookie season with 15 receptions on 16 targets for 171 yards and one touchdown and was rated the best rookie tight end by Pro Football Focus, who also rated him the best run-blocking tight end in the NFL.

Trautman entered the 2021 season as the starting tight end for the Saints after the team released Jared Cook in the offseason. He was placed on injured reserve on November 23, 2021. He was activated on December 18.

References

External links
New Orleans Saints bio
Dayton Flyers bio

1997 births
Living people
People from Antrim County, Michigan
Players of American football from Michigan
American football tight ends
Dayton Flyers football players
New Orleans Saints players